| tries = {{#expr:
 + 5 + 8 + 8 + 5 + 7 + 8 + 5 + 12
 + 8 + 9 + 8 + 8 + 9 + 4 + 3 + 10
 + 8+ 7 + 5 + 5+ 6 + 7 + 6 + 5
 + 3 + 4 + 5 + 10 + 5 + 6 + 6 + 9
 + 7 + 6 + 1 + 5 + 10 + 9 + 6 + 5
 + 3 + 9 + 5 + 4 + 5 + 7 + 3 + 9
 + 5 + 10 + 8 + 8 + 7 + 8 + 7 + 3
 + 5 + 10 + 8 + 8 + 7 + 8 + 7 + 3
 + 3 + 8 + 9 + 4 + 4 + 6 + 10 + 7
 + 4 + 5 + 8 +7 + 6 + 6 + 5 + 5
 + 9 + 5 + 2 + 7 +7  + 4 + 6 +7
 + 1 + 6 + 7 + 6 + 2 + 7 + 3 + 10
 + 6 + 8 + 3 + 6 + 7 + 7 + 6 + 2
 + 6 + 1 + 5 + 3 + 9 + 7
 + 8 + 6 + 9 + 6 + 7 + 6 + 6 + 8
 + 5 + 6 + 7 + 4 + 4 + 4 + 7 + 6
 + 7 + 4 + 9 + 4 + 4 + 4 + 4 + 6
 + 8 + 6 + 3 + 9 + 8 + 8
 + 10 + 8 + 4 + 13 + 2 + 11 + 6 + 8
 + 2 + 4 + 7 + 7 + 10 + 6 + 6 + 3
 + 7 + 4 + 4 + 3 + 8 + 5 + 2 + 5
 + 6 + 10 + 5 + 8 + 10 + 4 + 6 + 4
 + 8 + 4 + 5 + 2 + 1 + 2 + 5 + 3
 + 8 + 4 + 8
 + 6 + 5 + 6 + 1 + 5 + 5 + 7 + 7
 + 8
 + 11 + 13 + 8 + 8 + 8 + 3 + 6 + 6
 + 9 + 10 + 10 + 7 + 8 + 9 + 10 + 7
 + 10 + 6 + 4 + 9 + 12 + 9 + 5 + 5
 + 8 + 7 + 5 + 5 + 8 + 6 + 8 + 3
 + 6 + 9 + 6 + 6 + 5 + 10 + 8 + 8
 + 5 + 10 + 11 + 13 + 7 + 12 + 11 + 7
}}
| lowest attendance = 80 Blaydon v Fylde on 7 November 2015
| top point scorer =  Gareth Thompson (Hartpury College) 283
| top try scorer   =  Jonas Mikalcius (Hartpury College) Jason Smithson (Blaydon) 27
| prevseason       = 2014–15
| nextseason       = 2016–17
}}

The 2015–16 National League 1, known for sponsorship reasons as the SSE National League 1 is the seventh season of the third tier of the English rugby union system, since the professionalised format of the second tier RFU Championship was introduced; and is the twenty-ninth season since league rugby began in 1987.

Richmond are the current champions and will play in the Green King IPA Championship next season. Henley Hawks, Cinderford and Wharfedale are relegated. Henley and Cinderford to National League 2 South and Wharfedale to National League 2 North. Plymouth Albion went into administration on 8 April 2016 and an interim licence to run the club ended on 6 May 2016. Albion were deducted 30 points by the RFU and dropped from 5th place to 8th. The club have submitted a business case and await a decision by the RFU on 18 May. If the RFU reject the plan Albion could be relegated to the bottom of the league structure i.e. Devon League 2. If that happens Wharfedale will not be relegated and subsequently other teams down through the league structure could be reprieved.

Structure
The league consists of sixteen teams with all the teams playing each other on a home and away basis to make a total of thirty matches each. There is one promotion place and three relegation places. The champions are promoted to the Greene King IPA Championship and the bottom three teams are relegated to either National League 2 North or National League 2 South depending on the geographical location of the team.

Participating teams and locations

Twelve of the sixteen teams participated in last season's competition. The 2014–15 champions Ealing Trailfinders are promoted to the 2015–16 RFU Championship and are replaced by Plymouth Albion who were relegated from the 2014–15 RFU Championship after spending thirteen seasons in the league above. The three teams relegated last season, are Old Albanian, (to the 2015–16 National League 2 South), and Macclesfield and Tynedale, (both to the 2015–16 National League 2 North). The promoted teams are Henley Hawks and Hull Ionians champions of the 2014–15 National League 2 South and 2014–15 National League 2 North respectively, and Ampthill who won the promotion play-off against Bishop's Stortford.

League table

Fixtures

Round 1

Round 2

Round 3

Round 4

Round 5

Round 6

Round 7

Round 8

Round 9

Round 10

Round 11

Round 12

Round 13

Round 14

Postponed due to bad weather and waterlogged pitch.  Game rescheduled to 27 February 2016.

Postponed due to bad weather and waterlogged pitch.  Game rescheduled to 27 February 2016.

Round 15

Round 16

Round 17

Round 18

 Game rescheduled to 12 March 2016

 Game rescheduled to 27 February 2016

Round 19

Round 20

Round 21

Round 22

Round 23

Postponed matches (1)

Round 24

Postponed matches (2)

Round 25

Round 26

Round 27

Round 28

Round 29

Round 30

Blackheath's last ever first team game at the Rectory Field.

Attendances

Individual statistics
 Note if players are tied on tries or points the player with the lowest number of appearances is placed first (if they have the same number of games, then the less minutes played will rank first). Also note that points scorers includes tries as well as conversions, penalties and drop goals. Appearance figures also include coming on as substitutes (unused substitutes not included).

Top points scorers

Top try scorers

Season records

Team
Largest home win — 59 pts
71 – 12 Hartpury College at home to Blaydon on 23 January 2016
Largest away win — 46 pts
46 - 0 Hartpury College away to Henley Hawks on 17 October 2015
Most points scored — 71 pts
71 – 12 Hartpury College at home to Blaydon on 23 January 2016
Most tries in a match — 11
Hartpury College at home to Blaydon on 23 January 2016
Most conversions in a match — 9
Hartpury College at home to Hull Ionians on 30 April 2016
Most penalties in a match — 8
Hartpury College at home to Rosslyn Park on 9 April 2016
Most drop goals in a match — 3
Fylde away to Esher on 13 February 2016

Player
Most points in a match — 30
 Gareth Thompson for Hartpury College at home to Esher on 26 September 2015
Most tries in a match — 4 (x7)
 Jonas Mikalcius for Hartpury College away to Henley Hawks on 17 October 2015
 Spencer Sutherland for Esher at home to Coventry on 7 November 2015
 Peter Homan for Darlington Mowden Park at home to Hull Ionians on 21 November 2015
 Jonas Mikalcius for Hartpury College at home to Blaydon on 23 January 2016
 Ben Vellacott for Hartpury College at home to Blaydon on 23 January 2016
 Aquile Smith for Hull Ionians at home to Cinderford on 20 February 2016
 Jonas Mikalcius for Hartpury College at home to Wharfedale on 19 March 2016
Most conversions in a match — 9
 Gareth Thompson for Hartpury College at home to Hull Ionians on 30 April 2016
Most penalties in a match — 8
 Gareth Thompson for Hartpury College at home to Rosslyn Park on 9 April 2016
Most drop goals in a match — 3
 Chris Johnson for Fylde away to Esher on 13 February 2016

Attendances
Highest — 1,843
Plymouth Albion v Hartpury College on 23 April 2016
Lowest — 80 
Blaydon v Fylde on 7 November 2015   
Highest Average Attendance — 1,153
Plymouth Albion
Lowest Average Attendance — 243
Blaydon

See also
 English rugby union system
 Rugby union in England

References

External links
 NCA Rugby

National
National League 1 seasons